Giacomo Moris (born 1876 in Peer, Belgium) was a Belgian clergyman and bishop for the Roman Catholic Diocese of Roseau. He was ordained in 1900. He was appointed bishop in 1922. He died in 1957.

References 

1876 births
1957 deaths
Belgian Roman Catholic bishops
Roman Catholic bishops of Roseau